Ficus is a genus of large sea snails, marine gastropod mollusks in the family Ficidae, the fig shells.

This is the type of the family Ficidae. Previously it has been categorized in the family Muricidae by Tryon, 1873) and Tritonidae (by Mörch)

Description
The light, pyriform shell is ventricose, ribbed, and cancellated. The spire very short. The aperture large. The smooth columella  is simple. The elongated canal is straight. The thin outer lip is entire. There is no umbilicus.

Species
Species within the genus Ficus include:
 † Ficus condita (Brongniart, 1823) 
 Ficus dandrimonti Lorenz, 2012
 Ficus eospila (Péron & Lesueur, 1807)
 † Ficus ficoides (Brocchi, 1814)
 Ficus ficus Linnaeus, 1758
 Ficus filosa (Sowerby III, 1892) 
 † Ficus geometra (Borson, 1825) 
 Ficus gracilis (Sowerby I, 1825)
 † Ficus imperfecta P. Marshall & R. Murdoch, 1919
 † Ficus holmesii Conrad, 1867
 Ficus investigatoris (Smith, 1906)
 † Ficus pannus (Deshayes, 1864) 
 Ficus papyratia (Say, 1822)
 † Ficus parva Suter, 1917 
 † Ficus parvissima Harzhauser, Raven & Landau, 2018 
 Ficus pellucida Deshayes, 1856 
 † Ficus pilsbryi (Smith, 1907)
 † Ficus retinduta (de Gregorio, 1880) 
 Ficus schneideri Morrison, 2016
 † Ficus subintermedia (d'Orbigny, 1852) 
 Ficus variegata Röding, 1798
 Ficus ventricosa (Sowerby I, 1825)
 Ficus vosi H. Morrison, 2020

 Species brought into synonymy
 Ficus atlanticus Clench & Aguayo, 1940  : synonym of Ficus pellucida Deshayes, 1856
 Ficus carolae Clench, 1945  : synonym of Ficus papyratia carolae Clench, 1945
 Ficus communis Röding, 1798 : synonym of Ficus ficus (Linnaeus, 1758)
 Ficus ficoides (Lamarck, 1822)  : synonym of Ficus ficus  (Linnaeus, 1758)
 Ficus filosus (Sowerby III, 1892)  : synonym of Ficus filosa (Sowerby III, 1892)
 Ficus howelli Clench & Aguayo, 1940  : synonym of Ficus pellucida Deshayes, 1856
 Ficus lindae Petuch, 1988  : synonym of Ficus papyratia lindae Petuch, 1988
 Ficus margaretae Iredale, 1931  : synonym of Ficus ficus  (Linnaeus, 1758)
 Ficus pellucidus Deshayes, 1856 accepted as Ficus pellucida Deshayes, 1856
 Ficus subintermedius (d'Orbigny, 1852)  : synonym of Ficus subintermedia  (d'Orbigny, 1852)
 Ficus tessellatus (Kobelt, 1881)  : synonym of Ficus eospila (Péron & Lesueur, 1807)
 Ficus variegatus Röding, 1798  : synonym of Ficus variegata Röding, 1798
 Ficus ventricosus (Sowerby I, 1825)  : synonym of Ficus ventricosa (Sowerby I, 1825)
 Ficus villai Petuch, 1998: synonym of Ficus papyratia villai Petuch, 1998

References
 Lamarck J.-B. (M. de) (1799). Prodrome d'une nouvelle classification des coquilles, comprenant une rédaction appropriée des caractères géneriques, et l'établissement d'un grand nombre de genres nouveaux. Mémoires de la Société d'Histoire Naturelle de Paris 1: 63-91
 Vaught, K.C. (1989). A classification of the living Mollusca. American Malacologists: Melbourne, FL (USA). . XII, 195 pp
 Verhaeghe, M. & Poppe, G. T., 2000 A Conchological Iconography (3), The Family Ficidae
 Bouchet P., Rocroi J.P., Hausdorf B., Kaim A., Kano Y., Nützel A., Parkhaev P., Schrödl M. & Strong E.E. (2017). Revised classification, nomenclator and typification of gastropod and monoplacophoran families. Malacologia. 61(1-2): 1-526; page(s): 107; note: type species fixation

External links
 Röding P. F. (1798). Museum Boltenianum sive Catalogus cimeliorum e tribus regnis naturae quae olim collegerat Joa. Fried. Bolten M. D. p. d. Pars secunda continens Conchylia sive Testacea univalvia, bivalvia et multivalvia
 Montfort P. [Denys de]. (1808-1810). Conchyliologie systématique et classification méthodique des coquilles. Paris: Schoell. Vol. 1: pp. lxxxvii + 409 [1808]. Vol. 2: pp. 676 + 16

Ficidae